The Nicolaus-Cusanus-Gymnasium (NCG) is a secondary school in Bonn-Bad Godesberg, Germany. Its pupils range from Grade 5 to Grade 12. The main aspects of the school are a bilingual English-German branch, with lessons such as Geography, Politics and History taught in English and participation at THIMUN. In Grade 5 pupils can choose, if they want to be taught bilingual lessons.
The school's headteacher is Nicole Auen.

External links
 NCG Website 

Schools in Bonn